Canmore Nordic Centre is an 18-hole disc golf course located in Canmore Nordic Centre Provincial Park, in Canmore, Alberta, Canada. The course was designed in 1995 and features impressive views of the Rocky Mountains. Is widely regarded as one of the top disc golf courses in Alberta.

See also 
List of disc golf courses in Alberta

References

External links 

 
 Course map
 DG Course Review profile
 PDGA Course Directory profile

Disc golf courses in Alberta